Helmut Levy (born 16 March 1959) is a Colombian former swimmer who competed in the 1976 Summer Olympics and in the 1980 Summer Olympics.

References

1959 births
Living people
Colombian male swimmers
Colombian male freestyle swimmers
Male breaststroke swimmers
Jewish swimmers
Olympic swimmers of Colombia
Swimmers at the 1976 Summer Olympics
Swimmers at the 1979 Pan American Games
Swimmers at the 1980 Summer Olympics
Pan American Games competitors for Colombia
Competitors at the 1978 Central American and Caribbean Games
Central American and Caribbean Games gold medalists for Colombia
Central American and Caribbean Games medalists in swimming
20th-century Colombian people